Archibald Dean (3 October 1886 – 3 September 1939) was an Australian cricketer. He played one first-class cricket match for Victoria in 1920.

See also
 List of Victoria first-class cricketers

References

External links
 

1886 births
1939 deaths
Australian cricketers
Victoria cricketers
Cricketers from Melbourne